Oldenlandia aretioides is a species of plant in the family Rubiaceae. It is endemic to Yemen.

References

aretioides
Endemic flora of Socotra
Data deficient plants
Taxonomy articles created by Polbot